In music, a two hundred fifty-sixth note (or occasionally demisemihemidemisemiquaver) is a note played for  of the duration of a whole note. It lasts half as long as a hundred twenty-eighth note and takes up one quarter of the length of a sixty-fourth note. In musical notation it has a total of six flags or beams. Since human pitch perception begins at 20 Hz (1200/minute), then a 256th-note tremolo becomes a single pitch in perception at quarter note ≈ 18.75 bpm.

A single 256th note is always stemmed with flags, while two or more are usually beamed in groups. Notes this short are very rare in printed music but not unknown. One reason that notes with many beams are rare is that, for instance, a thirty-second note at =50 lasts the same amount of time as a sixteenth note at =100; every note in a piece may be notated as twice as long but last the same amount of time if the tempo is also doubled. They are principally used for brief, rapid sections in slow movements. For example, they occur in some editions of the second movement (Largo) of Beethoven's Third Piano Concerto (Op. 37) (1800), to notate rapid scales. Another example is in Mozart's Variations on "Je suis Lindor" (1778), where four of them are used in the slow (molto adagio) eleventh variation. A further example occurs (Grave.Adagio non troppo) in Jan Ladislav Dussek's (1760–1812) Fifth Piano Sonata, Op. 10 No. 2. They also occur (Largo) in Vivaldi's (1678–1741) Concerto, RV 444, and in bar 15 of François Couperin's Second Prelude from L'art de toucher le clavecin (1716).

Even shorter notes

The next note value shorter than the two hundred fifty-sixth note is the five hundred twelfth note with seven flags or beams; it is half as long as the two hundred fifty-sixth note. After this would come the thousand twenty-fourth note (eight flags or beams), the two thousand forty-eighth note (nine flags or beams), the four thousand ninety-sixth note (ten flags or beams), and so on indefinitely, with each note half the length of its predecessor. Anthony Philip Heinrich's Toccata Grande Cromatica from The Sylviad, Set 2, written around 1825, contains two 1024th notes (notated incorrectly as 2048ths). 256th notes occur frequently in this piece, and some 512th notes also appear; the passage is marked grave but the composer also intended a huge ritardando.

Brian Ferneyhough uses many note and rest values well smaller than a 256th note and rest in his 2014 work Inconjunctions. In addition to occasional 512th and 1024th rests, there are multiple examples of 4096th notes. Many of these are also contained within tuplets, making their ratio to the whole note even smaller.

Software
256th notes are easily accessible in Sibelius as of version 5. Some programs support even shorter notes. The shortest notated duration supported by Finale is a 4096th note, while LilyPond can write notes as short as a 1073741824th (2−30) note with up to 28 beams. MuseScore supports up to a 1024th note, which is also the shortest duration in the SMuFL standard.

See also
List of musical symbols
Snare rush
Totalism

References

Note values